Jason and Elizabeth Baylor Rector House is a historic building located south of Thurman, Iowa, United States.  Jason Rector is a native of Indiana who moved with his father, a Methodist minister,  in the late 1840s to southwest Iowa.  He became a farmer and land owner.  Rector returned to Indiana to marry Elizabeth Baylor.  They had no children of their own, but took in several homeless children.  The two-story brick Greek Revival house follows a T-plan.  Both floors have three rooms.  The first floor houses a living room, parlor and kitchen, and three bedrooms are located upstairs.  A screened in porch and a single-story wing are located adjacent to the kitchen on the first floor.  It is capped with a low-pitched gable roof.  The summer kitchen on the main floor was converted into a bathroom.  The house is located on an  farm located in the Loess Hills.  It was listed on the National Register of Historic Places in 2002.

References

Houses completed in 1859
Houses in Fremont County, Iowa
National Register of Historic Places in Fremont County, Iowa
Houses on the National Register of Historic Places in Iowa
Greek Revival houses in Iowa